The 1876 United States presidential election in Louisiana took place on November 7, 1876, as part of the 1876 United States presidential election. Voters chose eight representatives, or electors to the Electoral College, who voted for president and vice president.

Louisiana voted for the Republican nominee, Rutherford B. Hayes, over the Democratic nominee, Samuel J. Tilden. Hayes won the state by a narrow margin of 3.30%.

This would be the final presidential election until Dwight D. Eisenhower won the state in 1956 where a Republican presidential candidate would win Louisiana.

Results

See also
 United States presidential elections in Louisiana

References

Louisiana
1876
1876 Louisiana elections